The 2012–13 season is the 86th season in the history of OGC Nice and the club's 11th consecutive season in the top flight of French football. In addition to the domestic league, Nice are participating in this season's edition of the Coupe de France.

Players

First-team squad
As of 3 March 2013.

Transfers

Pre-season and friendlies

Competitions

Overall record

Ligue 1

League table

Results summary

Results by round

Matches

Coupe de France

Coupe de la Ligue

Statistics

Appearances and goals

References

OGC Nice seasons
Nice